is a 2013 and 2020 Japanese television series by Japanese broadcaster TBS based on the  of novels by . It follows the story of Hanzawa Naoki, a banker working for the largest bank in Japan, Tokyo Chuo Bank. He faces numerous obstacles from upper management as he climbs his way up the ranks. The show received consistently high ratings: the final episode of Season 1 reached 42.2% of viewers in the Kanto area, the highest figure for a drama in the Heisei Era.

The show's popularity in viewer polls achieved the highest rating in three decades of Japanese television drama.

Following its success as the most-watched series in Japan, Hanzawa Naoki made was broadcast overseas in Taiwan and Hong Kong, as well as Jamaica and the Marshall Islands. It was also distributed by Japan Foundation in some Latin American countries such as Mexico and Paraguay, dubbed in Spanish.

A second season was announced in 2019, scheduled for the spring of 2020. Due to the 2019–20 coronavirus pandemic, the series broadcast and filming was postponed. The second season premiered in Japan beginning in July 2020 and consisted of 10 episodes.

Cast
Masato Sakai as Naoki Hanzawa, a charismatic banker who works for the Tokyo Central Bank.
His family
Aya Ueto as Hana Hanzawa, the wife of Naoki Hanzawa.
Keita Ninomiya as Takahiro Hanzawa, the son of Naoki Hanzawa.
Shōfukutei Tsurube II as Shinnosuke Hanzawa, the father of Naoki Hanzawa.
Lily as Michiko Hanzawa, the mother of Naoki Hanzawa.
Tokyo Central Bank
Mitsuhiro Oikawa as Shinobu Tomari, a close friend of Naoki who he met during the induction of the bank.
Kenichi Takito as Naosuke Kondo', a former employee of Tokyo Central Bank and close friend of Naoki and Tomari.
Teruyuki Kagawa as Akira Ohwada, the director of Tokyo Central Bank.
Kin'ya Kitaōji (special appearance) as Ken Nakanowatari, the chairman of Tokyo Central Bank.
Jundai Yamada as Keijirō Fukuyama
Junpei Morita as Shingo Kishikawa
Arata Furuta as Yōichirō Mikasa
Yasunori Danta as Heihachi Kimoto
Ichikawa En'nosuke IV as Taiji Isayama
Kōtarō Yoshida as Hiroshi Naitō
Norihiko Tsukuda as Yūya Sonezaki
Kazuyuki Asano as Yoshinori Tomioka
Jingi Irie as Shun Tajima
Osaka Nishi branch
Kanji Ishimaru as Tadasu Asano, the branch manager at the Osaka Nishi branch.
Ichirōta Miyagawa as Hiroshi Ejima
Yuto Nakajima as Eiji Nakanishi
Kyōbashi branch
Kazuhisa Kawahara as Ikuo Kaise
Tōru Tezuka as Norio Kozato
Tokyo Central Securities
Kento Kaku as Masahiro Moriyama
Mio Imada as Hitomi Hamamura
Tōru Masuoka as Mitsuhide Oka
Narushi Ikeda as Shōichi Morota
Akihiro Kakuta (Tokyo 03) as Shigeyuki Miki
Tamiya Denki Inc.
Yasuyuki Maekawa as Motoki Tamiya
Gō Rijū as Hideyuki Noda
Iseshima Hotel
Taro Suruga as Takeshi Yuasa
Mitsuko Baisho as Natsuko Hane
Takashi Kobayashi as Shigenori Togoshi
National Tax Agency and Financial Services Agency
Kataoka Ainosuke as Shunichi Kurosaki, the inspector of National Tax Agency
Terunosuke Takezai as Ryōta Shimada
Hideo Ishiguro as Sagami
Mamoru Miyano  as Furaya
Spiral Inc.
Onoe Matsuya II as Yōsuke Sena
Ryo Yoshizawa as Kei Kōsaka
Dennō Zatsugi Shūdan Inc.
Hideo Tsuchida as Kazumasa Hirayama
Yoko Minamino as Miyuki Hirayama
The Government
Akira Emoto as Keiji Minobe
Noriko Eguchi as Akiko Shirai, the Minister of Land, Infrastructure, Transport and Tourism
Kazuya Kojima as Shigeki Kasamatsu
Teikoku Airways
Katsumi Kiba as Iwao Kamiya
Ken Ishiguro as Noboru Yamahisa
Atsushi Yamanishi as Hiroshi Nagata
Sōma Suzuki as Hideo Kitaki
Teikoku Airways reconstruction task force
Michitaka Tsutsui as Shōta Nohara
Development and Investment Bank of Japan
Naomi Nishida as Sachiyo Tanigawa
Others
Miku Natsume as Herself
Takashi Ukaji as Mitsuru Higashida
Mitsu Dan as Miki Fujisawa
Hidekazu Akai as Kiyohiko Takeshita
Takumi Kitamura as Ryōsuke Kuroki
Ian Moore as John Howard
Haruka Igawa as Tomomi Niiyama
Hiroko Nakajima as Rie Asano
Shigeyuki Totsugi as Yukinari Gouda

Plot

Osaka arc
Naoki Hanzawa (Masato Sakai) joins the Sangyo Chuo Bank (one of the predecessors of Tokyo Chuo Bank before its merger with Tokyo Daiichi Bank) and becomes Chief of the Loans Division at the Osaka Nishi branch. He is forced by branch manager Asano (Kanji Ishimaru) to grant an unsecured loan of 500 million yen to Nishi Osaka Steel. However, Nishi Osaka Steel goes bankrupt, and both president Mitsuru Higashida (Takashi Ukaji) and the 500 million yen loan disappear. Asano shifts the blame to Hanzawa and orders him to recover the amount. Hanzawa joins forces with Kiyohiko Takeshita (Hidekazu Akai), whose business was lost as collateral damage from Nishi Osaka Steel's bankruptcy. The two discover that the entire event was a scheme set up by Asano and Higashida. Racing against time and the Taxation Office investigation, Naoki is able to recover the entire 500 million yen for the bank. Hanzawa wishes to expose Asano to the media, but out of sympathy for his wife and family he instead leverages his evidence against Asano, ensuring that his subordinates can be promoted to positions of their choice. Subsequently, Hanzawa is promoted to deputy Manager of the 2nd Operations Department at banks' Tokyo Headquarters.

Tokyo arc
One year later, Hanzawa is placed in charge of investigating Iseshima Hotel, which borrowed 20 billion yen from Tokyo Chuo Bank. The hotel suffered a loss of 12 billion yen, and with an FSA (Financial Services Agency) inspection coming up, the bank may potentially have to provide a loan loss provision of 150 billion yen should Iseshima Hotel be labelled bankrupt. Hanzawa discovers that Director Owada (Teruyuki Kagawa) was at the forefront of providing the loan to Iseshima Hotel, even though there was substantial evidence showing that the hotel was not in a good financial position. Kondo (Kenichi Takito), a friend of Hanzawa who works at Tamiya Electric, discovers that Owada was also behind an indirect loan to Laffite, a fashion company owned by Owada's wife. Hanzawa puts this evidence against Owada in front of a board of directors meeting, leading to the demise of Director Owada. Seeking personal revenge for his father's death, Hanzawa forces Owada to kneel down before him and apologize for his actions in front of all the board members, despite his supervisor and the Chairman's disapproval. During the final scene, Chairman Nakanowatari is seen giving Owada a small demotion to board member while Hanzawa is "exiled" from the bank to Tokyo Central Securities.

Episodes

Recognitions
78th Television Drama Academy Awards: Best Actor - Masato Sakai
78th Television Drama Academy Awards: Best Supporting Actor - Teruyuki Kagawa
78th Television Drama Academy Awards: Best Director - Katsuo Fukuzawa
17th Nikkan Sports Drama Grand Prix (Jul-Sept 2013): Best Drama
17th Nikkan Sports Drama Grand Prix (Jul-Sept 2013): Best Actor - Masato Sakai
17th Nikkan Sports Drama Grand Prix (Jul-Sept 2013): Best Supporting Actor - Teruyuki Kagawa

References

External links
Hanzawa Naoki Official Website (Japanese) by Tokyo Broadcasting System

2013 in Japanese television
2013 Japanese television series debuts
2013 Japanese television series endings
2020 in Japanese television
2020 Japanese television series debuts
2020 Japanese television series endings
Financial thrillers
Japanese drama television series
Nichiyō Gekijō
Television shows based on Japanese novels
Television shows set in Osaka
Fiction about revenge